The Port of St. Augustine is a port facility in the city of St. Augustine, Florida.

History 
The port of St. Augustine was used as a naval facility for from late 18th-century onward.

References

External links

Buildings and structures in Florida
Transportation in St. Johns County, Florida
St. Augustine, Florida
St. Augustine